Hernando Tovar Brizneda (born 17 September 1938) is a Colombian footballer who played as a defender. He was part of the squad for the Colombia national team at the 1962 FIFA World Cup which was held in Chile and played in one qualifying game for the 1966 tournament.

Career
Tovar played club football with Santa Fe, where he won two Colombian league titles.

References

External links
 

1938 births
Living people
Colombian footballers
Association football defenders
Colombia international footballers
1962 FIFA World Cup players
Categoría Primera A players
Independiente Santa Fe footballers